The mountains in the McCullough Range lie mostly above the city of Henderson in the U.S. state of Nevada. The range has two distinct areas with the northern portion being primarily volcanic in origin, while the southern part of the range is primarily composed of metamorphic rock.

McCullough Range was named after a pioneer settler.

Wilderness Areas
Some of the northern part of the range is designated as the North McCullough Wilderness by the US Department of the Interior's Bureau of Land Management while some of the southern part of the range is similarly designated as the South McCullough Wilderness. In addition the North McCullough Wilderness Area is within the newly designated Sloan Canyon National Conservation Area which allows further protection and enhancement.

McCullough Range geography
The McCullough Range is surrounded by three valleys. First, the Las Vegas Valley lies to the north; next, the north region of the Ivanpah Valley, with two major dry lakes borders the west; and to the east lies the endorheic basin of the Eldorado Valley. The range specifically borders one mountain range at the south, being connected to the northeast higher elevation foothills of the New York Mountains. Just northeast of the intersection of the two ranges, and in the southwest of Eldorado Valley lies the small Highland Range.

Natural history

Northern
The peaks are volcanic in origin, rounded to flat-topped, and have a steep eastern escarpment and a gradual western slope. The area supports a unique combination of plants from the Mojave and Sonoran deserts and Great Basin Desert ecosystems.

The primary vegetation is a creosote bush community with barrel cactus (Ferocactus cylindraceus), Joshua trees (Yucca brevifolia), various chollas (Cylindropuntia spp.) and prickly pears (Opuntia spp.). Unlike other mountain ranges in Clark County, the McCullough Range is volcanic in origin. Examples of lava flows, ash falls and glassy zones are clearly visible. The area supports native black gramma grass (Bouteloua eriopoda), which is not known to occur anywhere else in Nevada and stands of teddy bear cholla (Cylindropuntia bigelovii), which is the northernmost extent of the species. Remarkable petroglyph panels and other important cultural resource features occur within the wilderness area.

Another peak northeast of Black Mountain is home to most of the radio and television transmission towers for the Las Vegas Valley.

Southern
The southern portion consists of a north–south mountain range that drops off gradually to numerous valleys, foothills and sloping bajadas on the east and west flanks. Most of the area is composed of metamorphosed Precambrian rock, granite, and schist, although basalt and andesite flows occur in the northern reaches of the southern portion. Scattered mesquite/catclaw communities also occur in washes throughout the area.

Signs of prehistoric and Pre-Columbian habitation have been found in the area, including rock art, occupation and settlement sites, and pinyon pine nut caches. This was part of the historic homeland of the Mojave people.

The desert tortoise, Nelson bighorn sheep, Gambel's quail and chukar are present.

References

This article incorporates public domain text from Bureau of Land Management sources listed above.

External links
The McCullough Range: information website
VOLCANOES of the MCCULLOUGH RANGE, southern Nevada
Volcanic Centers of the Northern McCullough Range

Mountain ranges of the Mojave Desert
Mountain ranges of Nevada
Mountain ranges of the Lower Colorado River Valley
Eldorado Valley
Ivanpah Valley
Mountain ranges of Clark County, Nevada
Protected areas of the Mojave Desert
Bureau of Land Management areas in Nevada